Aristolochia clusii is a species of plants in the family Aristolochiaceae.

Sources

References 

clusii
Flora of Malta